Fruity Robo (果宝特攻) is a CG Chinese animated children's series by Guang Zhou BlueArc Culture Communications Company. The show stems from the series Fruity Musketeers (果冻三剑客) and currently has four seasons.

Reception 
The show was ranked as one of the top 10 best animated series in China.

The series has been criticized as unsuitable for children, as it is used to advertise toys.

Song 

 Part 1 - Fruit Robots
 Part 2 - Special Fruits Team

References

2009 Chinese television series debuts
Chinese children's animated adventure television series
Chinese children's animated comedy television series
Computer-animated television series
Mandarin-language television shows